Mike Shooter of Nevill Hall Hospital, Abergavenny, was president of the Royal College of Psychiatrists from 2002 to 2005.

References

British psychiatrists
Fellows of the Royal College of Psychiatrists
Living people
Year of birth missing (living people)
Place of birth missing (living people)
21st-century British people